Meador is an unincorporated community in Mingo County, West Virginia, United States.

Two theories account for the origination of the community's name:
(1) It is named after a settler with the surname "Meador". Ambrose Meador (d.ca.1661/1663) immigrated from England to Warrisquicke (later Isle of Wight) County, Virginia before 1636. His descendants expanded into western Virginia and southern West Virginia, as well as Texas and beyond.
(2) It is a corruption of the word "meadow".

References

Unincorporated communities in Mingo County, West Virginia
Unincorporated communities in West Virginia